Alice Hannah Meiqui Greczyn (born February 6, 1986) is an American actress and model best known for roles in the films The Dukes of Hazzard, Shrooms, House of Fears and Sex Drive. She is also well known as Sage Lund in Lincoln Heights, and as Madeline "Mads" Rybak in The Lying Game.

Early life
Greczyn was born in Walnut Creek, California and lives in Hollywood, California. She is the oldest of five children. As a child, Greczyn competed in figure skating. She was home-schooled in Colorado, graduated early from high school, and started taking classes at Front Range Community College when she was 15 or 16. Informed that she had to be 18 to take Colorado's nursing test, she decided to try modeling and relocated to California. Greczyn is of European and Asian descent. On her heritage, Greczyn stated, "I'm mainly French, Japanese, and Polish, but there's also Chinese, Korean, German, Irish, Native American, Greek, Hungarian, Turkish, Swedish, and Czech."

Acting career
Greczyn started her career with a role in the movie Sleepover. She later appeared in the Fox comedy show Quintuplets as a recurring character. She was also cast in the short lived show Windfall. Greczyn played a recurring character on both Lincoln Heights and Privileged.

Greczyn was cast in a supporting role for the 2004 comedy Fat Albert and appeared in the 2005 film The Dukes of Hazzard.

In 2007, Greczyn appeared in the horror films House of Fears and Shrooms. The following year she appeared in the comedy, Sex Drive and the action film Exit Speed, opposite Fred Ward.

In 2011, Greczyn was a model for Victoria Beckham's denim and eyewear line. She appeared in three episodes of the ABC Family series Make It or Break It, playing a model struggling with anorexia. She starred as a series regular on another ABC Family show The Lying Game, as Madeline "Mads" Rybak.

Dare to Doubt

Greczyn was brought up in a Conservative Evangelical tradition which she later rejected. Her book Wayward: A Memoir of Spiritual Warfare and Sexual Purity describes her journey away from "toxic" religion. She hosts the website "Dare to Doubt", a resource portal for people seeking to escape from a belief system.

Filmography

Film

Television

References

External links
 Alice Greczyn biography from NBC.com
 

1986 births
American film actresses
American television actresses
Female models from California
Living people
People from Walnut Creek, California
American people of French descent
American actresses of Japanese descent
American film actors of Asian descent
American people of Polish descent
21st-century American actresses
American atheists